Wardi Abdul Latip is the 12th commander of the Royal Brunei Air Force (RBAirF) from 2012 to 2015. Notably, he was also the Bruneian defense attaché to China in 2007.

Education 
Throughout his career, he attended several institutes and training overseas including the Initial Officer Training (IOT) at the Royal Air Force College Cranwell, Lincolnshire, England, in December 1984, the Refresher Fast Jet Course at the RAF Church in Fenton, in 1989, obtained his Multi-engine Pilot Licence at the Palmerstone North, New Zealand's Massey Air University, in 1994, completed the Conversion Flying Training in November 1997, SAR Executive Planner Workshops organized by the civil Aviation Authority Brunei (CAA Brunei), Flight Safety and Flight Supervisor Course at RAF Bentley Priory, Maritime Surveillance Course at the Australian Defence Force Warfare Center (ADFWC), Maritime Surveillance Course at the SAFTI Military Institute (SAFTI), Malaysian Electronic Warfare Symposium, in 1996, Japanese Multinational Cooperation Assistance Program, in 2005, Australian Proliferation of Security Initiatives in 2005, and ASEAN+3 workshop on the Participation in International Disaster Relief Operation, China ASEAN Dialogue by Senior Defence Scholars on Regional Security Mechanism and Defence Policy in China between 2007 and 2008. Recently, he attended the Leadership for the 21st Century: Chaos, Conflict and Courage in Oct 2011 at Harvard Kennedy School, United States.

Military career
From 1982 to 1983, Wardi served as a pioneer in the Boys Company before enlisting in the Royal Brunei Armed Forces. After successfully completing his military training, he was later appointed as second lieutenant in December 1984. As a student pilot at No. 3 Basic Squadron Flight Training School in the Royal Brunei Air Force's Training Wing from 1984 to 1986, he started his flying career. He became a Co-Pilot for the Bell 212 helicopter at No. 1 Squadron, after finishing his flight training. He was fully operational as a pilot flying the Bell 212 for three years with No. 1 Squadron, after obtaining combat status six months later.

In 1989, Colonel Wardi was among the tiny group chosen to get training in fighter jets at the RAF Church in Fenton, Yorkshire. Starting with the Refresher Fast Jet Course for 82 flight hours in a Provost Mk5 jet, he underwent training in stages. At the RAF Valley, Holyhead, Wales, he then continued his Advanced Flying Training on the Hawk T Mk1. In addition, he was chosen to be a pilot for the Maritime Reconnaissance Aircraft Program and was transferred to Palmerstone North, New Zealand's Messey Air University, School of Aviation, to get a "Multi-engine Pilot Licence" in 1994. He was sent back to receive Conversion Flying Training in November 1997, after finishing this training. He founded No. 5 Squadron, which was formally established on 12 December 1997, after bringing the first CN-235 aircraft to Brunei upon completion of the training.

He was appointed in 2007 to serve as the defense attaché at the Brunei embassy in Beijing, China. From 7 to 9 September 2015, him alongside his delegations paid a three-day farewell visit to Singapore. The Royal Brunei Air Force has a new commander, with His Majesty the Sultan and Yang Di-Pertuan of Brunei Darussalam's approval. Brigadier general Wardi Abdul Latip and Colonel Shahril Anwar exchanged command during a ceremony for the RBAirF. On 25 September 2015, the Royal Brunei Air Force's headquarters at Rimba Air Force Base hosted a ceremony to mark the handover. On the next day, the new commander was officially appointed.

Later life 
In 2011, saw his appointment as the Ministry of Defence of Brunei Darussalam's Director of Personnel. On 26 June 2013, a golf tournament between the services took place at the Royal Brunei Armed Forces Golf Club. Wardi Abdul Latip represented the RBAF Training Institute. Later that year on 30 September, The Royal Brunei Air Force received the new Air Movement Center (AMC) in a formal handover. He came after the Director of DDWS and before the Permanent Secretary, Azmansham Mohamad. Wardi was appointed as the Director of Aviation under His Majesty at the Aviation Office on 14 October 2017, according to the Department of Public Services (JPA). This follows permission from Sultan Hassanal Bolkiah.

Honours

Namesakes 

 Wardi Drive, road name in Rimba Air Force Base officiated on 22 April 2022.

National 

  Order of Pahlawan Negara Brunei First Class (PSPNB) – Dato Seri Pahlawan (14 August 2014)
  Order of Setia Negara Brunei Fourth Class (PSB)
  Order of Seri Paduka Mahkota Brunei Third Class (SMB)
  Long Service Medal (Armed Forces)
  Silver Jubilee Medal – (5 October 1992)
  General Service Medal (Armed Forces)
  Royal Brunei Armed Forces Silver Jubilee Medal – (31 May 1986)
  Royal Brunei Armed Forces Golden Jubilee Medal – (31 May 2011)

Foreign 

 :
  Pingat Jasa Gemilang (PJG) – (2014)
 RSAF Honorary Pilot Wing – (2013)

 :
 Honorary Pilot Wings – (27 July 2015)

 :
  Panglima Gagah Angkatan Tentera (PGAT) – (4 December 2014)
 RMAF Honorary Pilot Wings – (5 August 2015)

 :
 TNI AU Honorary Pilot Wings – (1997)

 :
 Commemorative Medal (PCM)

References

Living people
Bruneian military leaders
Year of birth missing (living people)